The city of New Orleans, Louisiana, United States, is the site of 106 completed high-rises, 45 of which stand taller than . The tallest building in the city is Hancock Whitney Center, which rises  in the New Orleans Central Business District and was completed in 1972. It also stands as the tallest building in the state of Louisiana. The second-tallest skyscraper in the city is Place St. Charles, which rises . Nine of the ten tallest buildings in Louisiana are located in New Orleans.

The history of skyscrapers in New Orleans began with the construction of the Hennan Building in 1895; this building, rising , is often regarded as the first skyscraper in New Orleans. But, for most of the 20th century, the skyline of New Orleans consisted of only low and mid-rise structures. The soft soils of New Orleans are susceptible to subsidence, and there was doubt about the feasibility of constructing large high-rises in such an environment.
  This trend was broken with the construction of the World Trade Center in 1967. The Plaza Tower, completed in 1969, was the first building to exceed . Shortly thereafter, Hancock Whitney Center took its place as the city's tallest building in 1972. The oil boom of the late 1970s and early 1980s led to more construction of high-rises in New Orleans, with the completion of 17 of the city's 40 tallest buildings. Today, the high-rises of New Orleans are clustered along Canal Street and Poydras Street in the Central Business District. Poydras Street in particular has emerged as the city's principal high-rise corridor.

As New Orleans continues to recover from Hurricane Katrina, various projects have been proposed but increasing material and labor costs have eliminated some. Phase 3 of Canal Place is another skyscraper proposed for construction in the city. In addition, while not new construction, many of the older buildings in the central business district are undergoing renovations to condominium, apartment and hotel towers; these projects include the National American Bank Building.



Tallest buildings
This includes spires and architectural details but does not include antenna masts. An equal sign (=) following a rank indicates the same height between two or more buildings. The "Year" column indicates the year in which a building was completed.

Timeline of tallest buildings

This lists buildings that once held the title of tallest building in New Orleans as well as the current titleholder, Hancock Whitney Center.

Tallest buildings in Metarie
, an unincorporated area of Jefferson Parish.

See also
 Buildings and architecture of New Orleans
 List of tallest buildings in Metairie
 List of tallest buildings in Louisiana

External links
 Emporis.com - New Orleans
 Emporis.com - Metairie
 Diagram of New Orleans skyscrapers on SkyscraperPage

References

 
New Orleans
Tallest in New Orleans
buildings